Lutak is a Rusyn, Slovak and Ukrainian surname.

Meaning 
Versions of Zakarpattia philologist Pavlo Chuchka:
 From South Slavic ancestor's male name Luta using a suffix -ak as patronymic one. Luta is a variant of the official Serbo-Croatian names Milutin and Milun.
 From the Serbian noun lutak- "doll"(masculine),"children's toy in the form of a man".
 From Boyko or Old Polish measure of weight łut

Origin 
Probably, surname Lutak originated in the early 17th century in the northern regions of the Kingdom of Hungary, where the majority of the population were Rusyns, Slovaks, Croats, Vlachs and Serbs.

The references in historical documents 
For the first time in official documents surname Lutak is mentioned in historical Subcarpathian Rus in 1699 in Bereg Country - Lutak János and his son Vaszil 12-year-old from Nagy Ábránka (now Lokit, Irshava district, Zakarpattia Oblast, Ukraine). And in 1704 the same János Lutak is mentioned already as kuruc in Mukachevo list of Greek Catholics who participated in Rákóczi's War of Independence (1703-1711).

Notable people
 Medveczkyné Luták Edit (born 1932), Soviet, Ukrainian and Hungarian artist of decorative and applied arts, painter, graphic artist.
 Ivan Kondratyevich Lutak (1919 — 2009), Soviet party leader, First Secretary the Cherkasy Regional Committee of the Communist Party of Ukraine.

See also
Lutak (disambiguation)
HUNGARICANA. Archives, a common website of Hungarian archives, museums and libraries, operated by the Library of Parliament, Hungary.

References 

Slavic-language surnames